Kanithi Balancing Reservoir (KBR) is a reservoir in Ukkunagaram, Visakhapatnam, India. 
It is the water source for the entire Vizag steel plant and steel plant township.

This large mass of water reservoir is for the captive consumption of the plant and the township alike and sits between the Township and the NH16. It draws its water from a special canal built exclusively for it from the Yeleru River flowing in East Godavari district. The reservoir spans 2.2 km by 2.0 km area with 0.5 Tmcft water storage capacity.

Most of this fresh water consumption in the steel plant can be avoided by recycling the generated effluent water  which is drained into the sea.

See also
 Sileru River

References

Reservoirs in Visakhapatnam
Reservoirs in Andhra Pradesh
Geography of Visakhapatnam district
Geography of Visakhapatnam
Year of establishment missing